Ensemble Montréal is a municipal political party in Montreal, Quebec, Canada. Its elected officials are present in many districts in Montreal and represent the boroughs of Montréal-Nord (mayor, Christine Black), Saint-Léonard (mayor, Michel Bissonnet), Saint-Laurent (mayor, Alan DeSousa) and Pierrefonds-Roxboro (mayor, Dimitrios (Jim) Beis). Since November 16, 2021, Aref Salem is the interim leader and the 23 elected officials who sit on the Montreal City Council form the Official Opposition.

The party held power from 2013 until 2017 during the administration of Denis Coderre, at the time known as Équipe Denis Coderre pour Montréal. Following Coderre's defeat to Projet Montréal's Valérie Plante in the 2017 election, Coderre left municipal politics, and the candidates that had been elected under the party's banner changed its name to Ensemble Montréal.

The party has been a broad coalition of politicians who came from a variety of different parties prior to Ensemble's creation, but it is generally considered to sit to the right of Projet Montréal on most issues.  The party draws most of its support from wealthier and less-urbanized sectors of the city. As of 2019, Ensemble's caucus comes entirely from outer boroughs, after Cathy Wong, representing the Ville-Marie district of Peter-McGill, left the party.

2013 elections
The party was created in 2013 under the name Équipe Denis Coderre pour Montréal to support the candidacy of Denis Coderre for Mayor of Montréal during the November 3, 2013 municipal elections. In 2012, Denis Coderre announced his candidacy for mayor of Montreal. Beginning in June 2013, seventeen sitting members of Montreal City Council, as well as several borough councillors, switched their party affiliation to Coderre's team. Most were sitting as independent councillors following the dissolution of the Union Montréal party in the wake of Gérald Tremblay's resignation as mayor in 2012, although Coderre attracted support from former Vision Montréal and Projet Montréal councillors as well.

The party also announced a number of non-incumbent candidates in other races, including former Radio-Canada journalist Philippe Schnobb. However, the party also faced some criticism for the fact that of the 19 candidates announced by the party as of early August, fifteen were incumbents and only four were new candidates, resulting in media speculation that Coderre could potentially fall short of his early promise to put forward a slate of candidates that was at least 50 per cent new.

Councillors
After the 2013 election, Équipe Denis Coderre held the following seats on Montreal City Council and borough councils.

Former
The following incumbent councillors affiliated with Équipe Denis Coderre in 2013 during the preceding council, but did not run or were defeated in the 2013 election.

2017 elections
Denis Coderre also contested the Montreal municipal elections in 2017 under the name Équipe Denis Coderre pour Montréal. On losing the 2017 municipal election, Denis Coderre left municipal politics. To disassociate themselves from their resigning leader, the party known as Équipe Denis Coderre first declared an intention to change its name to "Mouvement Montréal", but failed to register the name before making the announcement, allowing another party to quickly reserve the name for themselves.

Thus, the party had to come up with another new name and changed to "Ensemble Montréal."

Councillors

Following the 2017 municipal election, Équipe Denis Coderre held the following seats on Montreal City Council and borough councils.

Former
The following incumbent councillors elected under the Ensemble Montréal formation are no longer part of it.

Political positions
Due in part to its largely suburban base, the party has often attacked Projet Montréal over policies it claims are "anti-car." Interim party leader Lionel Perez has attacked the Plante Administration over its handling of the pilot project limiting private vehicular access to the Mount Royal service road.

The party has not consistently supported expansions to Montreal's mass-transit network.  While then-Mayor Denis Coderre was a strong proponent of the Réseau express métropolitain, which is being built as a "public-public partnership" between the provincial government and the Caisse de dépôt et placement, the party has opposed the construction of the Pink Line (Montreal Metro).  Ensemble Montréal proposed a pilot project that would keep the metro system open during the overnight hours on summer weekends.

While it was in power from 2013–2017, Ensemble Montréal planned to heat and widen sidewalks along a stretch of Sainte-Catherine Street West. Once Projet Montréal took office in 2017, the heating elements were removed from Sainte-Catherine's renovation plans due to their expense, but plans to widen sidewalks and beautify the street were otherwise largely retained.

References

External links

List of Ensemble Montréal's elected officials by borough

Municipal political parties in Montreal
2013 establishments in Quebec
Political parties established in 2013